Hammonasset may refer to the following in the U.S. state of Connecticut:

Hammonasset, a historic area that is now the towns of Clinton and Killingworth
Hammonasset Beach State Park, in the town of Madison, New Haven County
Hammonasset Connector, a state highway
Hammonasset River, a tributary of Long Island Sound
Hammonasset School, in the town of Madison, New Haven County